Lahori Gate was a 2007 Pakistani comedy drama serial, aired on PTV Home.

The program's stars were Iftikhar Thakur, Sardar Kamal, Naseem Vicky, Abid Kashmiri, Waseem Abbas, Humaira Ali and Qavi Khan. The show was written by Waseem Abbas, who also acted in it. He is a son of Pakistan's late famous film playback singer Inayat Hussain Bhatti.

Shahid Aziz was the director and Syed Shahab was the producer of this comedy drama.

Cast 
 Iftikhar Thakur as Kukki Pehlwan
 Qavi Khan as Nosha (Kukki's father)
 Humaira Ali as Kulsoom (Kukki's mother)
 Abid Kashmiri as Pehlwan
 Waseem Abbas as Nosha's friend, also writer of this show
 Sardar Kamal as Ustad
 Naseem Vicky

References

External links
 Lahori Gate on YouTube

Pakistan Television Corporation original programming
Pakistani comedy television series
Pakistani television sitcoms
Urdu-language television shows